Seleucus VII Philometor or Kybiosactes, was a ruler of the Seleucid kingdom based in Syria. But his existence is disputed.

Biography

King of Syria
The last members of the once mighty Seleucid dynasty are shadowy figures; local dynasts with complicated family ties whose identities are hard to ascertain: many of them also bore the same names. Seleucus was unknown until recently. From coins issued by him and his mother, Ptolemaic princess Cleopatra Selene, it is presumed that he was her son by king Antiochus X Eusebes, and a brother of later king Antiochus XIII Asiaticus. He appears to have "reigned" during the occupation of Syria by Armenian king Tigranes (83-69 BC). In reality, only a few cities were loyal to the Seleucids during this period.

Some time after Tigranes had conquered Syria (83 BC), his mother travelled to Rome to have her sons recognized as kings of Egypt, but to no avail. They were there between at least 75 BC and 73 BC; recognized as "Kings of Syria", and "maintained a royal state".

Co-regent of Egypt
The young boy-king is probably the same Seleucus who later went to marry a Ptolemaic princess called Berenice IV on an unknown date (a sister of the famous Cleopatra VII of Egypt) to become co-regent of Egypt, but allegedly was murdered by the discontented bride for his lack of manners. He bore the derogatory name Kybiosaktes, the term for the foul-smelling work of cutting tuna fish.

Controversy
In 2002, the numismatist Brian Kritt announced the discovery and decipherment of a coin bearing the portrait of Cleopatra Selene and a co-ruler. Kritt read the name of the ruler as Seleucus Philometor and, based on the epithet, identified him with Cleopatra Selene's son, unnamed by Cicero. Kritt gave the newly discovered ruler the regnal name Seleucus VII, and considered it very likely that he is identical with Kybiosaktes. But Hoover rejected Kritt's reading, noting that the coin was badly damaged and some letters were unreadable. Hoover read the king's name as Antiochus and identified him with Antiochus XIII.

See also

 List of Syrian monarchs
 Timeline of Syrian history

References

 

1st-century BC rulers in Asia
1st-century BC Seleucid rulers
Ancient Egyptian royal consorts
Kings of Syria
People whose existence is disputed
Seleucid rulers